The Airdrome Dream Fantasy Twin is an American ultralight trainer and amateur-built aircraft, designed and produced by Airdrome Aeroplanes, of Holden, Missouri. The aircraft was derived from the single seat Airdrome Dream Classic and is supplied as a kit for amateur construction.

Design and development
The Airdrome Dream Fantasy Twin features a cable-braced biplane layout, a two-seats-in-side-by-side configuration open cockpit, fixed conventional landing gear and a single engine in tractor configuration mounted above the cockpit on the keel tube.

The aircraft is made from bolted-together aluminum tubing, with its flying surfaces covered in doped aircraft fabric. The standard engine used is the  two stroke Rotax 503, with  Rotax 582,  Rotax 447,  Rotax 377 or a  Volkswagen air-cooled engine optional. Building time from the factory-supplied kit is estimated at 200 hours by the manufacturer.

Operational history
Four examples had been completed by December 2011.

Specifications (Dream Fantasy Twin)

References

External links

Homebuilt aircraft
Single-engined tractor aircraft